Major Adam Charles Muir (1770 – 11 May 1829) was an officer in the British Army, who played a significant but little-known role in the Anglo-American War of 1812.

Early life
Muir was born in Scotland. The date is not definitely known; it may have been 1766 or 1770.

Military career

Early service, promotions
He enlisted as a private soldier in the 41st Regiment of Foot in 1778. He was evidently well-educated and very quickly rose through the ranks, becoming a Sergeant in only five months and later Sergeant-Major, and being commissioned as an Adjutant in 1793. He became an Ensign shortly afterwards, and was promoted to lieutenant the next year. He served with the regiment in the West Indies.

Arrival in Canada, marriage, further promotion
In 1799, the regiment was posted to Canada. In 1801, Muir married Mary Elizabeth Alexowina Bender in Montreal. The couple would eventually have ten children. Muir was promoted to captain in 1804. In 1811, the regiment, noted by Major-General Isaac Brock as being one of the steadiest units available in Canada, was sent to Upper Canada.

War of 1812
In 1812, when war with America broke out, Muir was in charge of the detachment of the regiment at Amherstburg. In this part of the province, there were few British troops, but large numbers of Indians inspired by the Shawnee leader Tecumseh aided the British. Muir was present at the Battle of Brownstown where Indians under Tecumseh routed an American detachment and captured vital despatches. Shortly afterwards, he commanded British troops and Indians at the Battle of Maguaga. Muir's troops were forced to retreat, but rallied, and the Americans withdrew without accomplishing their mission which was to clear a route for supplies to reach their army at Detroit.

Muir was wounded at Maguaga, but recovered to lead the main body of the 41st at the Siege of Detroit. Later in the year, Muir commanded another detachment sent to aid the Indians attacking Fort Wayne, Indiana. The attack failed, but Muir retreated successfully to Detroit. During the following year, he took part in the Battles of Frenchtown, Fort Meigs and Fort Stephenson. He was one of several officers who became critical of the leadership of the commander of the division, Major General Henry Procter. Finally, he was taken prisoner at the Battle of Moraviantown, when the by now starving and demoralised 41st Regiment gave way before a charge of Kentucky mounted riflemen.

After some months in captivity, Muir was released by an exchange of prisoners. He was promoted brevet major in 1814, and was appointed to command the militia in the Grand River district on the Niagara Peninsula, and played a small part in the Battle of Malcolm's Mills.

Post-war activities
After the war, the 41st returned to Britain. Muir was crippled by a fall from a horse in Ireland in 1816. He resigned from the Army two years later and returned to take up land in Lower Canada. He was forced to sell his farm and retired to an invalid hospital at William Henry, where he died in 1829, leaving large debts.

External links 
 

1829 deaths
41st Regiment of Foot soldiers
41st Regiment of Foot officers
British Army personnel of the War of 1812
1770 births
Immigrants to Lower Canada
Scottish emigrants to pre-Confederation Quebec
War of 1812 prisoners of war held by the United States